Chongqing University of Science and Technology is a university located in the Shapingba District of Chongqing City supported by the Chongqing Municipal People's government, the China National Petroleum Corporation, the China Petrochemical Corporation, and the China National Offshore Oil Corporation. The university was part of the "Engineering Excellence Education Program" and the "Data China 100 School Project". The university's programs focus on petrochemicals, metallurgy, machinery, materials, electronics, and environmental protection with courses offered in science, engineering, economics, management, law, literature, and the arts.

Location and campus
Chongqing University of Science and Technology (CQUST) is a public university offering both bachelor's and master's degree programs. It was officially established with the approval of the Ministry of Education in May 2004 through the merger of two colleges under the administration of two ministries of the central government. Both previous colleges had been well-known educational institutions, and Chongqing Petroleum College was a key college listed in the national model as a tertiary technical college. The new university received multiple designations, including:

 Pilot unit of the National Education Training Program for Excellent Engineers, 
 Deputy-directorial member of the National Association of Universities of Applied Sciences
 Deputy-directorial member of the National Union of New Colleges and Universities, and 
 Directorial member of Chongqing Municipal Universities Transformation and Development Alliance. 

CQUST has been strongly supported by the Chongqing Municipal government as a high-level new engineering college, and was rated as:

 National Model College in Innovation and Entrepreneurship
 National Model College in Innovation and Entrepreneurship Education Reform

In 2018, it was accredited as a master's institution.

Location 
CQUST covers an area of nearly 140 hectares, with a total built-up area of more than 600,000 square meters. It is located in Chongqing's high-tech zone which is the base of the western China scientific and technological innovation center. It is next to Gele Mountain National Forest Park in the east and Jinyun Mountain National Forest Park in the west.

Faculty 
CQUST has more than 1,500 faculty members, with over 1,200 full-time teachers, including 3 members of the China Engineering Academy. There are more than 120 high-caliber talents at provincial and ministerial levels including members of University Teaching Guidance Committee of the Education Ministry, national technical talents, Chongqing Talent Program, Bayu Scholars Program, academic (industrial) technology leaders, and Young and Middle-aged Pillar Teachers. There are more than 20,000 full-time students, including more than 600 postgraduates and 400 international students.

Schools 
CQUST has 16 schools: 
 School of Petroleum and Natural Gas Engineering
 School of Metallurgy and Materials Engineering
 School of Mechanical and Power Engineering
 School of Electrical Engineering
 School of Chemistry and Chemical Engineering
 School of Civil Engineering and Architecture
 School of Safety Engineering (School of Emergency Management)
 School of Marxism
 School of Business Administration
 School of Law, Political Science, Business and Trade
 School of Mathematics and Big Data
 School of Foreign Language
 School of Humanities and Arts
 School of Sports Science and Physical Education
 School of Intelligent Technology and Engineering
 Normal School of Vocational and Technical Education (School of Continuing Education, Self-Education Examination Department)

The university runs 7 professional and academic master’s programs in Petroleum and Natural Gas Engineering, Safety Engineering, Geography Engineering, Metallurgy Engineering, Chemistry and other fields.

Undergraduate programs 
There are 65 undergraduate programs at CQUST. Among them, Petroleum Engineering and Metallurgy Engineering are national first-class majors, and 17 other majors are first-class majors in Chongqing. It has 2 national-level specialty majors, 5 majors in the National Program for the Educational Cultivation of Excellent Engineers and 16 municipal-level specialty majors. Additionally, 8 majors have received the accreditation from the Engineering Education Accreditation Association.

Achievements 
The university has built 2 national-level and 8 municipal-level Experimental Teaching Demonstration Centers, 1 national-level and 3 municipal-level Virtual Simulation Experimental Teaching Centers, and 4 national-level Engineering Practice Education Centers. The university has 3 national-level excellent courses, including “Hydraulic Transmission Technology".

Amenities 
CQUST focuses on disciplines of Engineering, specializing especially in petroleum engineering, chemical engineering, metallurgy and materials engineering, machinery and electronics, safety and environmental protection. The school has laboratories in multiple areas including:
 Domestic waste recycling and utilization
 Exploration and development of complex oil and gas fields
 Nanocomposite materials and devices
 Non-mine safety and major hazard monitoring
 Occupational hazard detection and identification, 
 Industrial fermentation microorganisms 
 Energy engineering mechanics and disaster prevention and mitigation 
 Nanocomposite medical detection technology 
 Heavy oil exploitation

It also owns multiple research centers and a library with an area of more than 44,000 square meters housing 1.91 million printed books, and over 1.92 million e-books.

Projects 
Since 2014, CQUST has undertaken over 100 projects, including national key research and development programs, national major projects, projects funded by National Natural Science Foundation and National Social Science Foundation. Scientific researches authored by university faculty and staff have obtained more than 1,000 authorized patents and have won more than 70 provincial and ministerial scientific research achievements awards including the 2014 National Grand Prize of Science and Technology Progress, and the Innovation Achievement of China's industry-university-research cooperation projects.

Partnerships 
CQUST has established partnerships with multiple overseas universities including University of Illinois at Chicago, University of Regina in Canada, Haaga-Helia University of Applied Sciences in Finland, Hanze Hogeschool Groningen University of Applied Sciences in Holland, Veracruzana University in Mexico, Kyungpook National University in South Korea, Changwon National University in South Korea and National Central University in Taiwan. CQUST has also signed agreements with companies such asChina National Petroleum Corporation, Sinopec, China National Offshore Oil Corporation, Southwest Aluminum Group and Chongqing Iron and Steel Company.

References

External links 
Chongqing University of Science and Technology

Universities and colleges in Chongqing
Educational institutions established in 2004
2004 establishments in China